Peter Cole Knisely (August 11, 1887 – July 1, 1948) was a professional baseball player.  He was an outfielder over parts of four seasons (1912–15) with the Cincinnati Reds and Chicago Cubs.  For his career, he compiled a .235 batting average in 272 at-bats, with 29 runs batted in.

He was born in Waynesburg, Pennsylvania and died in Brownsville, Pennsylvania at the age of 60.

External links

1887 births
1948 deaths
Cincinnati Reds players
Chicago Cubs players
Major League Baseball outfielders
Baseball players from Pennsylvania
Wheeling Stogies players
Akron Rubbermen players
Birmingham Barons players
Memphis Chickasaws players
Nashville Vols players
Binghamton Bingoes players
Louisville Colonels (minor league) players
Toledo Mud Hens players
San Antonio Bears players
Bloomington Bloomers players
Peoria Tractors players
Danville Veterans players
Evansville Evas players